The 2020–21 Ukrainian First League is the 30th since its establishment. The league competition consists of 16 teams according to the decision of the PFL Council of Leagues.
The season commenced on 5 September 2020. The final composition and regulations of the Professional Football League of Ukraine both leagues were adopted at the PFL Conference on 21 August 2020.

Summary 
In this season, the bottom two teams of the First League are to be relegated to the Second League. The top two teams from each group of the Second League will gain promotion to the First League for the next season.

Promotion and/or relegation play-off games that were in place since 2011 (with exclusion in 2013) were discontinued altogether for the season.

This league's season was expected to have number of team increased to eighteen, however due to financial situation with both FC Karpaty Lviv and FC Balkany Zorya the PFL reinstated the sixteen team competition as per last season(see "Teams" section).

Due to the ongoing COVID-19 pandemic attendance restriction in the league is still in effect, but was partially eased. The postponed games that the PFL was not able to reschedule for the later dates of fall half of the season, on 30 November 2020 were rescheduled for the spring half of 2021.

Teams 
This season, Ukrainian First League consist of 16 teams, which includes top two teams from the both groups of 2019–20 Ukrainian Second League and two relegation/promotion play-offs winners.

Promoted teams 
The following teams have been promoted from the 2019–20 Ukrainian Second League:
 Nyva Ternopil – first place in Group A (returning after 5 seasons, last competed in the 2015–16 season)
 Polissia Zhytomyr – second place in Group A (debut, however another club named as Polissia Zhytomyr last competed in the 2004–05 season)
 Veres Rivne – play-off winner (returning after 3 seasons)
 VPK-Ahro Shevchenkivka – first place in Group B (debut)
 Krystal Kherson – second place in Group B (returning after 28 seasons, last competed in the 1992 league's inaugural season)
 Alians Lypova Dolyna – play-off winner (debut)

Relegated teams 
 None – Karpaty Lviv that placed 12th in the 2019–20 Ukrainian Premier League, were excluded from the league for repeated absence from scheduled games. A possibility was declared at first that the club might be admitted to the First League nonetheless, but later it was announced that Karpaty will be admitted the Second League instead. About a month later on 14 August 2020, Tribuna.ua informed that Karpaty never applied for certification for the next season in first or second leagues.

Legal and other issues
 FC Hirnyk-Sport Horishni Plavni was approved by the Ukrainian Association of Football (UAF) to play, after the UAF Chamber of Dispute Resolution order the club to pay compensation to its former player and the club completely ignored it.
 FC Balkany Zorya announced that it was considering withdrawing from the league as it is too expensive for the club.

Renamed teams 
 FC Obolon-Brovar Kyiv changed its name to FC Obolon Kyiv before the start of the season.
 FC Veres Rivne changed its name to RNK Veres Rivne before the start of the season.
 MFC Kremin Kremenchuk changed its name to FC Kremin Kremenchuk before the start of the season.
 FC Avanhard Kramatorsk changed its name to Avanhard-SK Kramatorsk at the during the latter (May 30) part of the season.

Location map 
The following displays the location of teams.

Stadiums 
The following stadiums were used as home grounds for the teams in the competition. The minimum capacity for stadiums of the First League clubs is set at 1,500 spectators.

Notes

Personnel and sponsorship

Managerial changes 

Notes:

League table

Results

Top goalscorers

Awards

Monthly awards 
The award is being selected on initiative of the PFL media partner UA-Football.

Round awards 

Notes:

Number of teams by region

See also
 2020–21 Ukrainian Premier League
 2020–21 Ukrainian Second League
 2020–21 Ukrainian Football Amateur League
 2020–21 Ukrainian Cup
 List of Ukrainian football transfers summer 2020
 List of Ukrainian football transfers winter 2020–21

References 

Ukrainian First League seasons
2020–21 in Ukrainian association football leagues
Ukraine